Rees is a very common Welsh name that traces back to the ancient Celts known as the Britons. The surname was first recorded in Carmarthenshire, and is derived from the personal name Rhys. Rhys is very common in Wales, and some parts of England. Rees is also a German surname.

Notable individuals named Rees include the following:

 Abraham Rees (1743–1825), compiler of Rees's Cyclopaedia and a botanist
 Alan Rees, British Formula One driver
 Albert E. Rees (1921–1992) American economist, presidential adviser, and Princeton provost.
 Albert E. Rees (actor) 19th-century comic opera actor
 Aneurin Rees (1858–1932), Wales rugby union international
 Angharad Rees (1949–2012), British actress
 Billy Rees (1924–1996), Welsh international footballer
 Brinley Rees (1919–2004), British classicist
 Celia Rees, British author
 Clive Rees, Wales and British Lions rugby union international
 Conway Rees (1870–1932), Welsh rugby union international
 Coralie Clarke Rees (1908–1972), an Australian author
 Dai Rees (born 1913), Welsh golfer
 Dai Rees (scientist) (born 1936), British biochemist and science administrator
 Dan Rees (rugby), Welsh international rugby player
 David Rees (disambiguation), several people
 Don Rees, warden of Hugh Stewart Hall in the University of Nottingham for 29 years
 Eleri Rees (born 1953), Welsh judge
 Elgan Rees, Wales and British Lions rugby union international
 Elmer Rees, British geometer
 Fernando Rees (born 1985), Brazilian auto racing driver
 Gareth Rees (disambiguation), multiple people, including:
 Gareth Rees (cricketer) (born 1985), Welsh cricketer
 Gareth Rees (motorsport commentator) (born 1969), Welsh motorsport commentator
 Gareth Rees (rugby union) (born 1967), former Canadian rugby player
 Gavin Rees (born 1980), Welsh professional boxer
 Geraint Rees, British neurologist and neuroscientist
 Goronwy Rees (1909–1979), Welsh journalist, academician, memoirist, and Soviet spy 
 Jason Rees, Welsh footballer
 Jean Rees (1914–2004), British artist
 Jeremy Rees (1937–2003), British arts administrator
 Jerry Rees, U.S. animator and film director
 John Rees (disambiguation), multiple people, including:
 John Rees (activist) (born 1957), British political activist and writer
 John Rees (journalist), American journalist
 Sir John David Rees (1854–1922), colonial administrator in British India and Member of Parliament
 John Rees (musician) (1857–1949), Welsh musician
 John Rawlings Rees (1890–1969), British psychiatrist
 Idwal Rees (1910–1991), Wales rugby union captain
 Ivor Rees (1893–1967), Welsh soldier and recipient of the Victoria Cross
 Katie Rees, a former American beauty queen
 Laurence Rees, (born 1957), British historian, author and documentary filmmaker
 Leighton Rees (born 1940), Welsh darts player
 Lionel Wilmot Brabazon Rees (1884–1955), Welsh World War I flying ace
 Lloyd Rees (1895–1988), Australian landscape painter
 Martin Rees, Baron Rees of Ludlow (born 1942), British Astronomer Royal
 Matt Rees, (born 1967) Welsh novelist
 Matthew Rees, Wales and British Lions rugby union international
 Merlyn Rees (1920–2006), British Labour party politician and minister
 Milsom Rees (1866–1952), Welsh surgeon
 Nathan Rees, (born 1968) Australian politician with the Labor Party, and Premier of New South Wales
 Nigel Rees (born 1944), English writer and broadcaster
 Nigel Rees (footballer) (born 1953), Welsh footballer
 Norman J. Rees (c. 1906 – 1976), double agent for USSR and FBI
 Peter Rees (1926–2008), British Conservative party politician
 Paul Rees (born 1986), British racing driver
 Robert Rees (disambiguation), several people
 Ronnie Rees, Welsh international footballer
 Roger Rees (1944–2015), Welsh actor
 Ronnie Rees (born 1944), Welsh footballer
 Stuart Rees, director of the Sydney Peace Foundation
 Thomas Rees (disambiguation), multiple people, including:
 Thomas Rees (Unitarian minister) (1777–1864), Welsh Unitarian minister and scholar
 Thomas Rees (Twm Carnabwth)  (c. 1806–1876; also known as Twm Carnabwth), Welsh leader of the Rebecca Riots
 Thomas Rees (Congregational minister) (1815–1885), Welsh Congregationalist minister
 Thomas Ifor Rees (1890–1977), Welsh diplomat and translator
 Tom Rees (rugby union) (born 1984), English rugby union player
 Tommy Rees (1904–1968), Welsh dual-code rugby player
 Thomas Wynford Rees (1898–1959), British soldier in the British Indian Army
 William Rees (disambiguation), several people

See also
 Rees (disambiguation)
 Reece (disambiguation)
 Reese (disambiguation)
 Rees-Jones
 Rees-Mogg
 Rhys

References

Anglicised Welsh-language surnames
English-language surnames